Lewis Barker (February 18, 1818 – October 9, 1890) was an American lawyer, State Senator, and State Representative from Bangor, Maine who was the Speaker of the Maine House of Representatives.

References
 

Speakers of the Maine House of Representatives
Republican Party members of the Maine House of Representatives
1818 births
1890 deaths
Republican Party Maine state senators
Politicians from Bangor, Maine
Members of the Executive Council of Maine
People from Penobscot County, Maine
19th-century American politicians